Jayajyotir Malla (often named Jyoti Malla for short) was the son of Jayasthiti Malla and the thirteenth Malla king of Nepal. He succeeded his brother Jayadharma Malla in 1408 and reigned until his death in 1428.

Reign 
It is believed that his reign co-existed with his two brothers after the death of his father in 1395. His elder brother, Jayadharma was given the full royal titles in Kathmandu, and Patan, while all three brothers were the joint rulers in Bhadgaon. Among the three brothers, Jyoti Malla lived the longest, and eventually assumed the title of King of the whole Kathmandu valley in 1408. He was succeeded by his son Yakshya Malla in 1428.

References 

Malla rulers of the Kathmandu Valley
Nepalese Hindus
1373 births
1428 deaths
14th-century Nepalese people
Nepalese monarchs
History of Nepal